Pouteria trigonosperma is a species of plant in the family Sapotaceae. It is found in Guyana and Suriname.

References

trigonosperma
Least concern plants
Taxonomy articles created by Polbot